"Focus" and "No Angel" are songs recorded by English singer and songwriter Charli XCX. They were released as a double single on 28 June 2018 by Asylum Records and Atlantic Records UK as the second installment from a series of monthly single releases. Both of the songs were performed live prior to their release.

Composition 
"Focus" is a "synth-driven, half-rapped" "hip hop" track which features the singer giving a demand for attention. Lake Schatz of Consequence of Sound compared the song to XCX's 2016 extended play Vroom Vroom. "No Angel" is a bouncy synth-pop anthem. It sees the singer admitting to having a wild side and wanting to prove herself worthy of love.

Critical reception
Julia Gray of Stereogum named "Focus" a "synth-driven, half-rapped track" and named "No Angel" a "bouncy, shimmering anthem". "No Angel" was named "Best New Track" by Pitchfork, describing the song as "effervescent 80s synth pop". Brittany Spanos of Rolling Stone called "Focus" an "unrepentant earworm, with that trademark XCX style of delivering an almost cruelly addictive, simple chorus." She wrote that "No Angel" "has the effortless cool that makes so many of her songs sound fresh and unmistakably her own." Mike Nied of Idolator wrote that "it is easy to imagine 'Focus' filling dance floors across the globe with its irresistible production." Nied praised "No Angel" for moving "her pop aesthetic into a more experimental realm and features some of her most earnest lyrics to date."

Track listing
Credits adapted from Qobuz.

Notes
  signifies an additional producer

Charts

"Focus"

References

2018 singles
Asylum Records singles
Atlantic Records singles
Warner Music Group singles